The Protogeometric style (or "Proto-Geometric") is a style of Ancient Greek pottery led by Athens produced between roughly 1030 and 900 BCE, in the first period of the Greek Dark Ages. After the collapse of the Mycenaean-Minoan Palace culture and the ensuing Greek Dark Ages, the Protogeometric style emerged around the mid 11th century BCE as the first expression of a reviving civilization. Following on from the development of a faster potter's wheel, vases of this period are markedly more technically accomplished than earlier Dark Age examples. The decoration of these pots is restricted to purely abstract elements and very often includes broad horizontal bands about the neck and belly and concentric circles applied with compass and multiple brush.  Many other simple motifs can be found, but unlike many pieces in the following Geometric style, typically much of the surface is left plain.

Like many pieces, the example illustrated includes a colour change in the main band, arising from a firing fault. Both the red and black colour use the same clay, differently levigated and fired.  As the Greeks learnt to control this variation, the path to their distinctive three-phase firing technique opened.

Some of the innovations included some new Mycenean influenced shapes, such as the belly-handled amphora, the neck handled amphora, the krater, and the lekythos. Attic artists redesigned these vessels using the fast wheel to increase the height and therefore the area available for decoration.

From Athens the style spread to several other centres.

Chronology
Alex Knodell, in his (2021) book, classifies Protogeometric period in three sub-periods:

See also

Mycenaean pottery
Archaic period

References

Cook, R.M., Greek Art, Penguin, 1986 (reprint of 1972), 
Murray, R. L. The Protogeometric Style: the first Greek style (1975).
Eiteljorg, H., "The fast wheel, the multiple brush compass and Athens as home of the Protogeometric style" American Journal of Archaeology (AJA) 84 (1980) pp. 445–452.

Further reading
Betancourt, Philip P. 2007. Introduction to Aegean Art. Philadelphia: INSTAP Academic Press. 
Preziosi, Donald, and Louise A. Hitchcock. 1999. Aegean Art and Architecture. Oxford: Oxford University Press.

External links
Greek Art & Archaeology, (Japanese and English)
Introduction to the Ancient World: Greece, University of Texas at Austin

11th century BC in Greece
10th century BC in Greece
11th-century BC works
10th-century BC works
Ancient Greek vase-painting styles
Mycenaean Greece
Iron Age Greek art
Greek Dark Ages